The Mexican Institute for Social Security and Services for State Workers or Civil Service Social Security and Services Institute (or ISSSTE) is a federal government organization in Mexico that administers part of Mexico's health care and social security systems, and provides assistance in cases of disability, old age, early retirement, and death (or IVCM, for invalidez, vejez, cesantía en edad avanzada, y muerte) to federal workers.  Unlike the Mexican Social Security Institute (or IMSS), which covers workers in the private sector, the ISSSTE is charged with providing benefits for federal government workers only.  Together with the IMSS, the ISSSTE provides health coverage for between 55 and 60 percent of the population of Mexico.

Like much of Mexico's health care system, the ISSSTE has been the subject of numerous criticisms and allegations, ranging from corruption to a heavy regional bias in favor of major cities with well organized labor unions. In September 2020, former director of FOVISSSTE José Reyes Baeza Terrazas was accused of embezzling MXN $129 million (US $6.14 million) as part of the Estafa Maestra ("Master Scam").

ISSSTE was founded on December 30, 1959 by president Adolfo López Mateos.

In addition to ISSSTE, which is exclusive for employees of the federal government, states in Mexico have their own separate health and retirement system for government workers within its own state. For example, the state of Tabasco offers its employees retirement, health, and other similar benefits through an agency called Instituto de Seguridad Social del Estado de Tabasco, or "ISSET".

See also
 Secretariat of Health (Mexico) 
 Mexican Social Security Institute

References

External links
Official ISSSTE website (in Spanish)

Government of Mexico
1959 establishments in Mexico
Organizations established in 1959
Medical and health organizations based in Mexico